IMBA can refer to:
 Institute of Molecular Biotechnology, Vienna, Austria 
 International Masters of Business Administration
 International Mountain Bicycling Association
 Imba, a full-stack web programming language
 Gaming slang for game imbalance
 Tony Anak Imba, a Malaysian who was serving a life sentence with caning in Singapore for murder since 2014.

See also
 Himba (disambiguation)